Bibi, also spelled Bebe, means Miss in Urdu and is frequently used as a respectful title for women in South Asia when added to the given name.  

Bibi, like Begum, is used as a surname by many women in the region.

In Anglo-Indian, the term bibi came to be seen as a synonym for mistress.

Notable people known by this title
 Aisha Bibi, 12th-century noble woman, after whom a memorial and village are named in modern Kazakhstan
 Bibi Ambha, the Hindu mother of Sikandar Lodi
 Asia Bibi, a Catholic Christian worker accused of blasphemy in Pakistan
 Bushra Bibi, wife of Imran Khan and First Lady of Pakistan
 Sultana Chand Bibi (1550–1599 CE), also known as Chand Khatun or Chand Sultana, Indian Muslim woman warrior
 Islam Bibi, (1974–2013), Afghan policewoman and human right activist.
 Noorjahan Kakon Bibi, female freedom fighter in Bangladesh
 Mukhtaran Bibi (born  1972, now known as Mukhtār Mā'ī), survivor of a gang rape in Pakistan
 Pari Bibi, noblewomen of Mughal Empire buried in Lalbagh Fort, Dhaka
 Taramon Bibi, female freedom fighter in Bangladesh
 Taj Bibi, Empress consort of Emperor Jahangir and mother of Emperor Shah Jahan

References

Titles in Pakistan
South Asian culture
Urdu-language words and phrases
Hindi words and phrases
Titles in Bangladesh
Titles in India
Women in Asia